The 1964–65 1.Lig was the seventh season of professional football in Turkey. Fenerbahçe won their fourth title, becoming the first club to win four league titles.

Overview
Fenerbahçe qualified for the European Cup, while Turkish Cup winners Galatasaray qualified for the European Cup Winners' Cup. Göztepe qualified for participation at the Inter-Cities Fairs Cup. Metin Oktay finished top scorer with 17 goals, winning his fifth Gol Kralı award. Altınordu were the only club relegated, while newly promoted Şeker Hilal finished one point above relegation.

Final league table

Results

References

Süper Lig seasons
1964–65 in Turkish football
Turkey